Aknadinine (also known as 4-demethylhasubanonine) is an opioid alkaloid isolated from members of the genus Stephania (Stephania cepharantha and Stephania hernandifolia.). Structurally it is a member of the hasubanan family of alkaloids and features an isoquinoline substructure.

See also
 Hasubanonine

References

Opioids
Pyrrolidine alkaloids